Robert Kelle was the member of Parliament for Coventry in 1298. He was a merchant.

References 

Members of the Parliament of England for Coventry
English MPs 1298
Year of birth unknown
Year of death unknown
English merchants